In 1976 the All Blacks toured South Africa, with the blessing of the then-newly elected New Zealand Prime Minister, Rob Muldoon. Twenty-five African nations, Afghanistan, Albania, Burma, El Salvador, Guyana, Iraq and Sri Lanka protested against this by boycotting the 1976 Summer Olympics in Montreal. In their view the All Black tour gave tacit support to the apartheid regime in South Africa. The five Maori players on the tour, Bill Bush, Sid Going, Kent Lambert, Bill Osborne and Tane Norton, as well as ethnic-Samoan Bryan Williams, were offered honorary white status in South Africa. Bush asserts that he was deliberately provocative toward the apartheid regime while he was there.

The All Blacks achieved a record of 18 wins and 6 losses, and they lost the test series 3–1.

Matches
Scores and results list New Zealand's points tally first.

Touring party

Manager: Noel Stanley (Taranaki)
Assistant Manager (and Coach):  JJ Stewart (Wanganui)
Captain: Andy Leslie

References

External links
 New Zealand in South Africa 1976 from rugbymuseum.co.nz

New Zealand
Rugby union tour
All Black tour
New Zealand national rugby union team tours of South Africa
Rugby union and apartheid